Dolgarrog railway station is an unstaffed halt, and a request stop, on the Conwy Valley Line from Llandudno Junction to Blaenau Ffestiniog.

The station is located on the east bank of the River Conwy just across the A470 road from Plas Maenan, which was the home of Henry Jack, the Managing Director of the Aluminium Corporation from 1916 to 1927, together with its associated enterprises including the Ffestiniog Railway and the Welsh Highland Railway. Plas Maenan is now a small country house hotel and restaurant with views across the valley.

History
The station was built by the LNWR in 1916 to provide sidings and an interchange facility with a short standard gauge industrial line, built by the Aluminium Corporation to serve Dolgarrog village and the aluminium works that are about a mile from the station on the west bank of the river. The aluminium works closed in 2007, and is now the site of Surf Snowdonia, an inland surfing lagoon.

The industrial line crossed the river by a substantial girder bridge. The bridge, long used as a footbridge, and the only way to reach the station from the village of Dolgarrog, is now slated for closure. It was initially equipped with two locomotives, ten 12 ton wagons, and two passenger carriages. Morning and evening passenger services were free and operated from 1917 to 1932. Goods traffic, which was heavy during the war, continued but declined in the 1950s. The line closed in 1960 and was lifted in 1964.

The station was closed on 2 November 1964 but was reopened on 14 June 1965.

Facilities
The station is unmanned and has a single platform, with basic amenities only (waiting shelter and timetable poster board). It also has a digital CIS display like other stations on the branch. Access to the platform is via a foot crossing and path from the A470 road.

Usage
The station became the least used station in Wales for the period 2017–18, mainly due to Sugar Loaf station increasing its usage by more than sevenfold from the previous year. The previous low usage for Sugar Loaf, 228 passengers for 2016–17, seems to have made it popular. It saw over 1,800 passengers for 2017–18, whilst Dolgarrog saw a fall of almost 40% passenger usage to 612.

Services

Transport for Wales Rail operates five southbound and six northbound trains that call on request Mon-Sat (approximately every three hours), with three trains each way on Sundays between May and early September. Following serious flood damage to the line in multiple locations in March 2019, services from this station were suspended for four months and replaced by buses whilst major infrastructure repairs were carried out. Dolgarrog was one of two stations severely damaged by the floodwaters. The damaged platform was removed and the line reopened to traffic on 18 July 2019, but with Dolgarrog station remaining closed. On 22 November 2019 the line closed again for three weeks for a new platform to be built at Dolgarrog and rock bolts to be installed in Ffestiniog Tunnel, reopening on 15 December. Further damage to the line occurred in February 2020, this time by Storm Ciara with services again being suspended until the line was reopened on 28 September 2020.

References

Further reading

External links

Conwy Valley Railway
Dolgarrog Railway Society

Llanddoged and Maenan
Railway stations in Conwy County Borough
DfT Category F2 stations
Railway request stops in Great Britain
Former London and North Western Railway stations
Railway stations in Great Britain opened in 1916
Railway stations in Great Britain closed in 1964
Reopened railway stations in Great Britain
Railway stations in Great Britain opened in 1965
Railway stations served by Transport for Wales Rail
Dolgarrog